Space + Time is a jazz music album by hip hop producer Madlib's 'Yesterday's New Quintet' fictional character R.M.C..

Track listing
All tracks composed, arranged, and produced by Madlib.

 "High Stakes Place"
 "Space & Time"
 "60 N' Fig"
 "XU"
 "Lotto Master"
 "Solaris II"

External links
 Space & Time on Discogs.

2010 albums
Madlib albums